Paek Jong-suk (born 9 January 1962) is a North Korean sports shooter. She competed in the women's 25 metre pistol event at the 1992 Summer Olympics.

References

1962 births
Living people
North Korean female sport shooters
Olympic shooters of North Korea
Shooters at the 1992 Summer Olympics
Place of birth missing (living people)
Shooters at the 1990 Asian Games
Asian Games medalists in shooting
Asian Games bronze medalists for North Korea
Medalists at the 1990 Asian Games
20th-century North Korean women